Socialist Party of Italian Workers (PSLI) is the name for a political party that has been used by three distinct organizations of the political left in Italy.

Italian Socialist Party (1893–1895) 
PSLI was the first name of the Italian Socialist Party (PSI) from 1893 to 1895.

Unitary Socialist Party (1925–1927) 
The most well known usage of PSLI was as the name of the Unitary Socialist Party (PSU) from 1925 to 1927.

Italian Democratic Socialist Party (1947–1951) 
PSLI was the name of the Italian Democratic Socialist Party (PSDI) from 1947 to 1951.

See also 
 Democratic Socialist Party
 Labour Party
 Social Democratic Party
 Socialist Party
 Socialist Party (disambiguation)
 Workers' Party

References 

Defunct social democratic parties in Italy